Matěj Marič (born 11 September 1991) is a professional Czech football player who currently plays for TJ Kunice, on loan from FK Dukla Prague.

References

External links

Guardian Football

Czech footballers
1991 births
Living people
Czech First League players
FK Dukla Prague players

Association football midfielders
FK Kunice players